Philip Salkeld VC (13 October 1830 – 10 October 1857) was an English recipient of the Victoria Cross, the highest and most prestigious award for gallantry in the face of the enemy that can be awarded to British and Commonwealth forces. He was the first person to be awarded the Victoria Cross posthumously.

He was born at the Rectory in Fontmell Magna, Dorset, England, educated at King's College School, London, and is buried in the Old Delhi Military Cemetery, Delhi, India.

Details
Salkeld was 26 years old, and a lieutenant in the Bengal Engineers, Bengal Army during the Indian Mutiny when the following deed took place for which he together with Duncan Charles Home was awarded the VC:

He was killed in action at Delhi on 10 October 1857.

Salkeld's companion at King's College School, Robert Haydon Shebbeare also received the Victoria Cross on the same day for his action in the fourth column attacking Delhi at the Kabul Gate.

References

 Monuments to Courage (David Harvey, 1999)
 The Register of the Victoria Cross (This England, 1997)
 The Sapper VCs (Gerald Napier, 1998)

External links
 Royal Engineers Museum Sappers VCs

1830 births
1857 deaths
People educated at King's College School, London
British recipients of the Victoria Cross
People from North Dorset District
Indian Rebellion of 1857 recipients of the Victoria Cross
British military personnel killed in the Indian Rebellion of 1857
Bengal Engineers officers